In the Storm (U oluji) is a Croatian film directed by Vatroslav Mimica. It was released in 1952.

External links
 

1952 films
Croatian crime drama films
1950s Croatian-language films
Yugoslav crime drama films
Films directed by Vatroslav Mimica
Jadran Film films
1952 directorial debut films
Yugoslav black-and-white films